The abbreviation AWFC can refer to one of the following:

 Airport West Football Club
 American West Football Conference
 Armthorpe Welfare F.C.
 Arsenal W.F.C.
 Askern Welfare F.C. aka Askern Villa